The De Boisse (possibly a.k.a. Denis de Boisse), was a French automobile manufactured from 1901 until 1904 by Jacques de Boisse in Paris.

Company
The company was based in Paris, (one source states in the 11th arrondissement).  It manufactured automobiles from 1900 to 1904. Several sources agree on 'De Boisse as the brand name, but one also mentions 'Denis De Boisse'. One source states that De Boisse ceased production in 1904. It remains unclear whether that was one person, several people or a company name. Possible activities of the company before 1900 or after 1904 are not known.

Vehicles

1901
The first model was a tricycle. The single-cylinder engine was water-cooled. It was mounted above the single front wheel and drove it via a chain. It was steered with a long tiller (lever). The open body offered space for two people. De Boisse competed in the 1901 Paris–Bordeaux motor race, but did not finish.

1902
In 1902 a conventional four-wheel model appeared. It had a 6 hp De Dion-Bouton inboard engine with a shaft drive. According to two sources, the rear axle was designed as a De Dion axle.

1903
In 1903, two vehicles took part in the Paris–Madrid race, subsequently known as the "Race of Death". Jacques De Boisse was classified 87th out of 99 finishers, completing in 12 hours, 0 minutes, 55 seconds. Monsieur Dupeux was classified 98th, completing in 16 hours, 18 minutes, 10 seconds.

1904
In 1904 the final model featured a two-cylinder, 12 hp, De Dion-Bouton engine. A source describes a light car with a 12 hp twin-cylinder engine and a patented 'double rear axle'.

See also
 Louise Sarazin

References

Sources
 Harald H. Linz, Halwart Schrader : The International Automobile Encyclopedia . United Soft Media Verlag, Munich 2008, ISBN 978-3-8032-9876-8 , Chapter De Boisse.
 George Nicholas Georgano (ed.): The Beaulieu Encyclopedia of the Automobile . tape 1 : A–F . Fitzroy Dearborn Publishers, Chicago 2001, ISBN 1-57958-293-1 , pp. 395 (English).
 George Nicholas Georgano : Cars. Encyclopedia complete. 1885 a nos jours. Courtille, Paris 1975, p. 214 (French).
 David Burgess Wise: The New Illustrated Encyclopedia of Automobiles . Greenwich Editions, London 2004, ISBN 978-0-86288-258-7 , pp. 252 (English).

External links 
 French Motorcycles - Levassor and De Boisse.

Defunct motor vehicle manufacturers of France
French companies established in 1901
French companies disestablished in 1904